Cabinet of Boris Yeltsin and Yegor Gaidar was Russian Cabinet of Ministers under the leadership of President Boris Yeltsin and First Deputy Prime Minister Yegor Gaidar, which was in office from 6 November 1991 to 23 December 1992.

Yeltsin led the Council of Ministers to carry out radical economic reforms aimed at liberalizing the economy. He headed the Cabinet since 6 November 1991 to 15 June 1992. From 15 June to 14 December 1992, the Cabinet was directed by the acting Prime Minister Gaidar.

In December 1992, Boris Yeltsin proposed to the Congress of People's Deputies of Russia Gaidar's candidacy for the post of Prime Minister of Russia, however, he was denied by the people's deputies.

Gaidar was replaced by the cabinet of Viktor Chernomyrdin.

Ministers

Ministries and committees in italics have been renamed, merged or abolished.

|}

References

Yeltsin
Boris Yeltsin
Yeltsin
Yeltsin